Antimony fluoride may refer to either of the following:

Antimony trifluoride, SbF3
Antimony pentafluoride, SbF5